Horst Gläsker (born March 21, 1949 in Herford, Germany) is a German artist. His work is a symbiosis of music, dance, theatre, drawing, painting, sculpture, installation and architecture.

Development 
From 1963 to 1966 Horst Gläsker did an apprenticeship as a showcase designer and in the following years up to 1968 he worked as poster artist. From 1970 to 1973 he visited a course of lectures and did the university-entrance diploma. Parallel to this he was active as a musician. During the 60s he and his 4 brothers were in a dance combo and in the 70s he was involved with diverse Kraut-rock groups of the era. At the end of the 70s he began to build sound sculptures and to make music performances. From 1973 to 1979 he studied at the Kunstakademie Düsseldorf, with Lambert Maria Wintersberger, Gerhard Richter and Karl Otto Götz. 1975 he lived 1 year in a mountain shelter in the Toscana where he painted landscapes and portraits and grappled intensely with the effect of colours. After that he developed a painture out of his colour palettes, collected old Persian carpets from the rubbish and painted psychedelic colour patterns on its ornaments which had the consequence, that Gerhard Richter expelled him from his class. After that Gläsker worked alone in an abandoned room, belonging to the suspended professor Joseph Beuys, who had been dismissed without notice by Johannes Rau, the minister of science at that time, because he indiscriminately admitted all people who applied to the academy. Later Gläsker became master student of Karl Otto Götz (professor of Sigmar Polke, Franz Erhard Walther and others).

Work 
Art scientists have linked Horst Gläsker with the category “Individual Mythology” coined by Harald Szeemann or grouped him with the “Junge Wilde” ("wild youth"). The closest definition of his art is perhaps the idea of the “Gesamtkunstwerk”. Harald Falckenberg (see: Collection Falckenberg), the Hamburger art collector, businessman, lawyer and art theorist, described him as ”bird of paradise and holy fool” and saw him in a reference to the newer development of the “pictorial turn” and the ancient tradition of the grotesque. Besides the relation of his art to music, there is the connection with architecture. This began in the 80s with space filling painting on wallpapers, self built and repainted architectural pieces, and space frame works like columns, candelabra, cupolas, and pavilions etc. Following on from that there were numerous “art in architecture” applications and projects, for example murals, mosaics, fountains and floor designs. The art theorist and curator Manfred Schneckenburger named Gläsker, in relation to his carpet and wallpaper paintings, the European founder of the Pattern Art and wrote that he developed his own particular new, idea of the ornament, “as if the hard verdict of Adolf Loos “ornament is a crime” had never existed".

Life 
Horst Gläsker lives and works in Düsseldorf, Germany. He has an artist family. He works organizationally and artistically together with his wife Margret Masuch-Gläsker. Their two common children are Louis Gläsker (artist, musician, writer, and filmmaker) and Cecilia Gläsker (filmmaker, camerawoman and photographer).

Teachings 
1983-1984: visiting professorship at the Kunstakademie Münster, Germany
1988–1991: visiting professorship at the Kunstakademie Münster, Germany
1995–1997: visiting professorship at the Hochschule für Bildende Künste Braunschweig, Germany
1998–2004: professorship at the Kunsthochschule Kassel, Germany
2006: Guest lecturer at the Savannah College of Art and Design, Georgia, USA

Individual exhibitions (selection) 
1980: Galerie Löhrl, Mönchengladbach
1981: Kunst- und Museumsverein Wuppertal / Von der Heydt-Museum
1981: Neue Galerie-Sammlung Ludwig, Aachen
1990: Gustav-Lübcke-Museum, Hamm
1998: Kunstmuseum Düsseldorf
2003: Galerie Hans Mayer, Düsseldorf
2005: St. Petri Lübeck

Joint exhibitions (selection) 
1980: Les nouveaux Fauves-Die neuen Wilden, Neue Galerie-Sammlung Ludwig, Aachen
1980: XI. Biennale de la Jeunesse, Musée d'Art moderne, Paris
1981: Bildwechsel (Change of Picture), Akademie der Künste, Berlin
1983: Montevideo Diagonale, Antwerpen
1985: Märchen, Mythen, Monster (Fairy tales, Myths, Monsters), Neue Galerie Graz und Rheinisches Landesmuseum, Bonn
1986: Bonnefantenmuseum, Maastricht
1994: Paper Art, International Biennial of Paper Art, Leopold-Hoesch-Museum, Düren
1998: Glut (Ardour), Kunsthalle Düsseldorf
2004: ARTKlyazma, International festival of contemporary art, Moskau
2007: Tatort Paderborn, Irdische Macht – Himmlische Mächte (Crime Scene Paderborn, Earthly Power - Heavenly Powers)

Public commissions - Art in Architecture (selection) 
1988: Wall and fountain mosaic, Landeszentralbank, Frankfurt / M.
1988: Mural, AID-Gebäude, Bonn
1990: Tower of the Four Elements and murals, im Posttechnischen Zentralamt, Darmstadt
1998: Two church rooms, JVA Gelsenkirchen
1999: Mural and column painting, Paracelsus-Klinik Marl
2008: Scala, Holsteiner Treppe, Wuppertal
2008: Cross and World Mirror, Sankt Martin Kirche, Langenfeld

Performances and concerts with Sound Sculptures (selection) 

Pedal-Organ-Carpet-Concerts

1980: XI Biennale de Paris, Musée d'Art modern de la Ville de Paris
1980: Von der Heydt-Museum, Wuppertal
1981: Neuen Galerie-Sammlung Ludwig, Aachen
 
Table Concerts

1987: Kunstmuseum Chur, Schweiz
2004: Louisiana-Museum, Humlebaek, Dänemark
2004: ARTKliazma, International festival of contemporary art, Moskau
2005: Langen-Foundation, Raketenstation - Insel Hombroich, Neuss

Living Pictures

1991: Der Tanz des Schüttelgeistes und die Verführung des Ton (The Dance of the Shivering Spirit and the Enticement of Tone), Düsseldorfer Schauspielhaus
1992: Gesang der vier Elemente (Song of the Four Elements), Kunsthalle Recklinghausen, Ruhrfestspiele
1993: Der Gesang der vier Elemente und die Verführung des Lichts (The Song of the Four Elements and the Enticement of Light), MEDIALE, Deichtorhalle, Kammerspiel, Hamburg and Städtisches Gustav-Lübcke-Museum, Hamm and ARENA DI SKALA, Lindinger und Schmid, Regensburg

See also
 List of German painters

Notes

References 
 Architektenkammer Nordrhein-Westfalen (ed.): Horst Gläsker - Verführung des Raums. Lindinger und Schmid, 2006,

External links 
 Official Website of Horst Gläsker
 
 Books and catalogues about Horst Gläsker in BAM-Portal
 Horst Gläsker in artnet
 Horst Gläsker in kunstaspekte

Artist families
20th-century German painters
German male painters
21st-century German painters
21st-century German male artists
1949 births
Living people
Kunstakademie Düsseldorf alumni
20th-century German sculptors
20th-century German male artists
German male sculptors